The Passionate Adventure is a 1924 British silent drama film directed by Graham Cutts and starring Clive Brook and Alice Joyce. The film was adapted from a novel by Frank Stayton by Alfred Hitchcock and Michael Morton, with Hitchcock also credited as assistant director to Cutts.

The Passionate Adventure is also notable as the first film released under the aegis of Michael Balcon's newly formed Gainsborough Pictures.

Plot
The marriage between Adrian and Drusilla St. Clair (Brook and Joyce) has become unsatisfactory and loveless since Adrian's return from World War I, with the couple treating each other with cold distance.  Seeking escape from his unfulfilled home life, Adrian takes off to the East End of London where he disguises himself as a shabby itinerant.  There he meets a pretty young waif Vicky (Marjorie Daw) and takes on the role of her unofficial protector.

This does not go down well with Vicky's East End criminal element boyfriend Herb (Victor McLaglen) who becomes increasingly suspicious and jealous about her association with Adrian, until a showdown in inevitable.  Adrian uses his wits to overcome Herb's brute force, and hands him over to the police who have wanted him for some time.  With Herb in custody and Vicky's safety assured, Adrian returns west to Drusilla invigorated by his East End experience and with his feelings of passion towards her evidently restored.  They embrace at the bottom of the staircase, which the appreciative Drusilla starts to climb.

Cast

Reception
Walter Mycroft, reviewing the film for the Evening Standard, wrote that ‘For absolute skill in production and for inspiration in setting,' The Passionate Adventure 'reaches a high level, far higher than was actually entailed by the particular story Graham Cutts and his coadjutors here had to handle.'

See also
 Alfred Hitchcock filmography

References

External links 
 
 
 

1924 films
1924 drama films
British silent feature films
Films directed by Graham Cutts
Gainsborough Pictures films
Films set in London
British black-and-white films
Films based on British novels
British drama films
1920s British films
Silent drama films